New Bandon-Salmon Beach is a local service district in New Brunswick, Canada.  New Bandon was named after the town of Bandon in Ireland. It is located immediately East of the City of Bathurst, New Brunswick  on Nepisiguit Bay.

History

It was a centre of grindstone production in the nineteenth and twentieth centuries until about 1945. In the later years, pulp-stones were produced. There was also a shipbuilding industry associated with the grindstone exports.

Notable people

See also
List of local service districts in New Brunswick

References

Communities in Gloucester County, New Brunswick
Designated places in New Brunswick
Local service districts of Gloucester County, New Brunswick
Mining communities in New Brunswick